"Midnight Love Affair" is a 1976 song by Carol Douglas from the album of the same name. Along with the track "Crime Don't Pay", the song went to number one for one week on the Billboard disco/dance chart. The single failed to chart on either the Billboard Hot 100 or the R&B chart.

"Midnight Love Affair" was written in French by Pierre Groscolas and Michel Jourdan ("Ma jeunesse au fond de l'eau"), adapted in English by Estelle Levitt and produced by Eddie O'Loughlin.

References

1976 singles
1976 songs
Disco songs